List table of the properties and districts — listed on the California Historical Landmarks — within San Bernardino County, Southern California. 

Note: Click the "Map of all coordinates" link to the right to view a Google map of all properties and districts with latitude and longitude coordinates in the table below.

Listings

|}

See also

List of California Historical Landmarks
National Register of Historic Places listings in San Bernardino County, California

References

  
 

.
List of California Historical Landmarks
Geography of San Bernardino County, California
Protected areas of San Bernardino County, California